Gil is a syndicated comic strip written and illustrated by the American cartoonist Norm Feuti. It is distributed by King Features Syndicate.

On 2 December 2013, Feuti announced that Gil would cease publication at the end of the year.<ref>{{Cite web |url=http://gilcomics.com/gil-coming-to-an-end/ |title="Gil Coming to an End," gilcomics.com, 2 December 2013 |access-date=2013-12-03 |archive-url=https://web.archive.org/web/20131206042825/http://gilcomics.com/gil-coming-to-an-end/ |archive-date=2013-12-06 |url-status=dead }}</ref> However, on May 11, 2014, Feuti announced that Gil would return as a Sunday-only comic in the Providence Journal''.  On January 1, 2023, Feuti announced that the Providence Journal decided to stop carrying the feature at the end of 2022.

Setting 
Gil the title character, is a chubby elementary school student who is usually picked last in school for sports. He lives with his divorced factory working mother Cheryl. Gil prefers instead to live in a nuclear family, thinking it would give him superpowers. He is shown visiting his father Frank every week.

Cast
Gil 
A chubby and cheerful eight-year-old boy, who loves comic books, video games and superheroes. He is an only child who lives with his mother and visits his father on alternate weekends.

Shandra
Gil's best friend, neighbor, and classmate. Shandra's parents also are divorced. She has signature puffy pigtails and a very sensible attitude. She is a loyal friend and a very supportive confidante.

Cheryl
Gil's mom is a very hardworking single mother who works full-time in a factory.

Frank 
Gil's dad is shown to be a lazy underachiever.

Morgan
is Gil's mean-spirited classmate and antagonist.

Troy
Cheryl's boyfriend

Voltron
Gil and Cheryl's cat

Mr. Klopec Gil's neighbor, who usually is seen on the porch of the apartment building

Footnotes

External links
Gil official site
Norm Feuti's Cartoons

American comic strips
2012 comics debuts
School-themed comics
Male characters in comics
Child characters in comics
Slice of life comics
Comics characters introduced in 2012
Comics set in the United States
Gag-a-day comics